Germán Pablo Chiaraviglio Ermácora (born 16 April 1987 in Santa Fe) is an Argentine pole vaulter.

Biography
His personal best of 5.71 metres was achieved at the World Junior Championships in Beijing on August 19, 2006, when he beat the old championship record (CR) of István Bagyula from 1988, and the Argentine senior record.  He also holds the South American indoors record, with 5.52 metres, and is the only Argentine athlete to conquer a gold medal in any World Championship at any category.

Germán was first coached by his father within a family of pole vaulters; his brother Guillermo Jr. (in 2001) and sister Valeria (in 2005) also participated in World Junior Championships. During the 2006 South American Games, he won the gold medal (5.65 m) and his brother Guillermo silver (5.20 m). He currently trains in Italy with pole vaulting star Yelena Isinbayeva, co-coached by Vitaly Petrov.

In 2010 Germán won the Platinum Konex Award from Argentina as the best Atlete from the last decade in his country.

In 2015, he finally broke his own national record (after 9 years), jumping 5.75 at the Pan-American Games.

Personal best

Achievements

References

External links
 
 Personal data at IAAF
 Interview at IAAF
 

1987 births
Living people
Argentine people of Italian descent
Argentine male pole vaulters
Sportspeople from Santa Fe, Argentina
Olympic athletes of Argentina
Athletes (track and field) at the 2008 Summer Olympics
Athletes (track and field) at the 2016 Summer Olympics
Athletes (track and field) at the 2007 Pan American Games
Athletes (track and field) at the 2011 Pan American Games
Athletes (track and field) at the 2015 Pan American Games
Athletes (track and field) at the 2019 Pan American Games
Pan American Games silver medalists for Argentina
Pan American Games bronze medalists for Argentina
World Athletics Championships athletes for Argentina
Pan American Games medalists in athletics (track and field)
South American Games gold medalists for Argentina
South American Games silver medalists for Argentina
South American Games medalists in athletics
Competitors at the 2014 South American Games
Athletes (track and field) at the 2018 South American Games
Medalists at the 2007 Pan American Games
Medalists at the 2015 Pan American Games
South American Championships in Athletics winners